William Connell was an Anglican priest in the mid-eighteenth century.

A graduate of Trinity College Dublin and Prebendary of Mayne, he was appointed Archdeacon of Ossory in 1758; and died on 27 March 1762.

References

Irish Anglicans
Alumni of Trinity College Dublin
Archdeacons of Ossory
1762 deaths